Those Who Kill is an American crime drama television series developed by Glen Morgan. The series originally premiered on the American cable television network A&E on March 3, 2014, and was re-launched on its sister network, the Lifetime Movie Network, on March 30.  It is based on the Danish television series Den som dræber. The show was shot on location in Pittsburgh, Pennsylvania.  On May 18, 2014, Morgan announced the show had been cancelled after only ten episodes.

Plot
Catherine Jensen, a recently promoted homicide detective, enlists the help of Thomas Schaeffer, a forensic psychologist, to track down serial killers and relentlessly seeks the truth behind the disappearance of her brother that she thinks is linked to his stepfather, Judge Howard Burgess.

Cast

Main cast
Chloë Sevigny as Detective Catherine Jensen
James D'Arcy as Dr. Thomas Schaeffer
James Morrison as Commander Frank Bisgaard
Bruce Davison as Judge Howard Burgess
Omid Abtahi as Detective Jerry Molbeck
Kerry O'Malley as Medical Examiner Mia Vogel

Recurring cast
Anne Dudek as Benedicte Schaeffer
Michael Rispoli as Detective Don Wilkie
Dino Rende as John Schaeffer
Kathy Baker as Marie Burgess
Kyle Bornheimer as Paul Cavallo
Desmond Harrington as Detective Nico Bronte
Michael Weston as The Space Cowboy
Vinessa Shaw as Angela Early
Michelle Veintimilla as Sarah Branson

Production
In January 2012, the A&E television channel announced that it had bought the rights to develop a U.S. version of the Danish series, Those Who Kill. A pilot episode began filming in Pittsburgh in December 2012, produced by Fox 21 and written by Glen Morgan, with Chloë Sevigny starring as Pittsburgh Police homicide detective Catherine Jensen, and James D'Arcy as forensic psychologist Thomas Schaeffer.

In April 2013, A&E announced that it had greenlit a 10-episode first season of the series, which would begin production in Pittsburgh in late 2013. Drawn to the region due to state tax credits, filming lasted from September to December 2013. Producers selected locations such as warehouses, parking garages, pubs, hospitals, theaters, penitentiaries, the Allegheny County Courthouse, Riverview Park, the Carnegie Free Library of Allegheny, and the abandoned Carrie Furnace to capture the mood of the series.

Reception
Those Who Kill received mixed reviews. It received 54/100 score from 22 reviews at Metacritic. Review aggregator Rotten Tomatoes reports that seven out of 24 critics gave the series a "rotten" rating. The site's consensus is, "In spite of its suspenseful premise and an effective performance by Chloë Sevigny, Those Who Kill is bogged down by monotonous plots and senseless violence." The series debuted on March 3, 2014, with 1.4 million total viewers, and drew 830,000 viewers for its second episode. A&E then pulled the drama from its schedule, with plans to relaunch it in a new time slot. Instead, the series was shifted to A&E's sister network, the Lifetime Movie Network, for a re-launch.

Episodes

References

External links
 
 

2010s American crime drama television series
2014 American television series debuts
2014 American television series endings
A&E (TV network) original programming
American action television series
American detective television series
American television series based on Danish television series
English-language television shows
Fictional portrayals of the Pittsburgh Bureau of Police
Television series by 20th Century Fox Television
Television shows filmed in Pennsylvania
Television shows filmed in Pittsburgh
Television shows set in Pittsburgh
Television series by Imagine Entertainment